The Naco Group is a geologic group in Arizona. It preserves fossils dating back to the Permian period.

See also

 List of fossiliferous stratigraphic units in Arizona
 Paleontology in Arizona

References
 

Geologic groups of Arizona
Permian System of North America